The Fifth Periodic Review of Westminster constituencies was undertaken between 2000 and 2007 by the four boundary commissions for England, Scotland, Wales and Northern Ireland for the UK Parliament. The changes for England, Wales and Northern Ireland took effect at the 2010 United Kingdom general election; that for Scotland took effect at the 2005 election. All of the recommendations were approved.

Review process
The boundary commissions were required at the time by the Parliamentary Constituencies Act 1986 to review constituencies in their part of the United Kingdom every eight to twelve years. The Commissions' recommendations from the review were based on the numbers of electors on the electoral register and ward boundaries at the start of the review in 2000.

In Scotland, the recommendations were submitted in November 2004, and approved in February 2005. In Wales, the recommendations were submitted on 31 January 2005, and approved on 11 April 2006. In England, the recommendations were submitted on 31 October 2006, and approved on 13 June 2007. In Northern Ireland, the recommendations were submitted on 14 September 2007 and approved on 11 June 2008.

Changes

These were the first major changes to UK Parliamentary constituencies since 1997.

As set out in the approval dates above, the Scottish changes were effective from the 2005 general election. The post-2010 shape of those for the rest of the UK can be viewed alongside those for Scotland of 2005 at United Kingdom Parliament constituencies. 

A side effect of reviews is the number of seats won by each party may change (even if all voters repeated their votes at later elections).

The total number of Scottish seats dropped from 72 to 59, due to changes made by the Scotland Act 1998, applying the English electoral quota to Scotland. This had reduced total seats back down from 659 to 646, pending the review of the rest of the UK. Only three seats remained unchanged: East Renfrewshire (formerly named Eastwood), and quota-immune Orkney and Shetland, and Na h-Eileanan an Iar (formerly named Western Isles).

In Wales, the total seats remained 40, but entailed radical redrawing in Clwyd and in Gwynedd. Aberconwy, Arfon and Dwyfor Meirionnydd replaced Conwy, Caernarfon and Meirionnydd Nant Conwy respectively. Per 2006 statistics, Welsh seats have on average 16,000 fewer electors than those of England.

The Boundary Commission for Northern Ireland recommended minor changes to seats would take place in the east of the province.

In England, the seats recommended seldom straddle the largest council areas, i.e. counties (metropolitan or otherwise); however they may cross boundaries of unitary authorities. York was consolidated to have two seats, without electoral wards from North Yorkshire. The unitary authorities of Berkshire are represented in Westminster by many cross-authority seats.

The Boundary Commission for England created one extra seat each to represent ten non-metropolitan counties: Cornwall, Derbyshire, Devon, Essex, Hampshire, Lancashire, Norfolk, Northamptonshire, Warwickshire and Wiltshire; and one covering the area of the former county of Avon. This was partly offset by the abolition of one seat in each of the six metropolitan counties of Greater Manchester, Merseyside, Tyne and Wear, South Yorkshire, West Midlands and West Yorkshire, together with a net loss of one seat in Greater London. 

London was reviewed borough-by-borough – some were "paired". This means they see one or more straddling seats. This solution ensures that the sizes of the electorates are not too disparate, in other words, quite fairly apportioned to reflect the adult resident population. Two boroughs lost a seat and one area of central London gained a constituency.

The approved recommendations for the three countries saw a net increase of 4 seats from 646 to 650 (for the 2010 general election).

New and abolished constituencies
As a result of changes to the names of seats, it is not always easy to clearly identify newly created constituencies or those abolished during the review process. One way of considering this is to link each proposed seat with an existing seat which contributes the most voters to that new seat. Any proposed seat which cannot be linked to an existing seat is then considered to be a "new" constituency. Conversely, any existing seat which is not linked to a proposed seat is considered to have been abolished. 

Accordingly, the following seats are regarded as new creations:

Central Devon
Chelsea and Fulham
Chippenham
Filton and Bradley Stoke
Kenilworth and Southam
Meon Valley
Mid Derbyshire
Mid Norfolk (as reconfigured)
South Northamptonshire
St Austell and Newquay
Witham
Wyre and Preston North

NB - the existing seat of Mid Norfolk is succeeded by Broadland (see below) and the reconfigured Mid Norfolk is therefore considered to be a new constituency.

The following English constituencies are regarded as having been abolished by the review process:

Barnsley West and Penistone
Birmingham Selly Oak (existing configuration)
Brent East
Eccles
Hornchurch
Knowsley North and Sefton East
Normanton
Sunderland South

NB - the proposed constituency of Birmingham Selly Oak is preceded by the existing constituency of Birmingham Hall Green; and, in turn, the proposed constituency of Birmingham Hall Green is preceded by Birmingham Sparkbrook and Small Heath (see below).

Name changes 
In England, there was a total of 72 linked constituencies which involved a change of name. A majority of these involved significant changes resulting from the knock-on impact of new or abolished seats within review areas. However, some arose from the consultation process and involved only minor changes. The table below lists those constituencies with name changes, indicating the extent of the changes by reference to the proportion of the old constituency included in the new constituency, or the proportion of the new in the old, which ever is the lesser:

 Minor - greater than 90%
 Moderate - between 75% and 90%
 Major - between 75% and 50%
 Wholesale - less than 50%

Other major changes 
In addition to the changes listed above, the following 45 constituencies were subject to major changes whilst retaining their names.

See also
Sixth Periodic Review of Westminster constituencies
List of United Kingdom Parliament constituencies

References

Footnotes

Bibliography
 Fifth Periodical Report, Boundary Commission for England, . Contains list of boundary changes in England.
 Fifth Periodical Report, Boundary Commission for Northern Ireland, . Contains list of boundary changes in Northern Ireland.
 Fifth Periodical Report, Boundary Commission for Scotland, . Contains list of boundary changes in Scotland 
 Fifth Periodical Report, Boundary Commission for Wales, . Contains list of boundary changes in Wales.

2010 United Kingdom general election
2005 United Kingdom general election
5
2000s in the United Kingdom
2005 in British politics
2010 in British politics